Ruth Todd may refer to:
 Ruth Todd (researcher), American geologist and paleontologist
 Ruth D. Todd, African-American writer